Wāṣil ibn ʿAtāʾ (700–748) was an important Muslim theologian and jurist of his time, and by many accounts is considered to be the founder of the Muʿtazilite school of Kalam.

Born around the year 700 in the Arabian Peninsula, he initially studied under Abd-Allah ibn Muhammad ibn al-Hanafiyyah, the grandson of Ali. Later he would travel to Basra in Iraq to study under Hasan of Basra (one of the Tabi‘in).  In Basra he began to develop the ideologies that would lead to the Muʿtazilite school.  These stemmed from conflicts that many scholars had in resolving theology and politics.  His main contribution to the Muʿtazilite school was in planting the seeds for the formation of its doctrine.

Wasil ibn Ata died in 748 in the Arabian Peninsula.

He married the sister of Amr ibn Ubayd.

See also 
Islamic scholars
Hasan al-Basri

References

External links
 Wasil ibn Ata an article by Encyclopædia Britannica online.

Mu'tazilites
Mujaddid
700 births
748 deaths
8th-century Muslim scholars of Islam
8th-century Arabs